Monterosi is a comune (municipality) in the Province of Viterbo in the Italian region Lazio, located about 30 km (18,64 mi) north of the Grande Raccordo Anulare of Rome, about 40 km (24,85 mi) south of Viterbo.

Geography
Monterosi’s territory is located halfway through between Rome and Viterbo along the Via Cassia, on the north-easter foot of the Sabatine Hills, not far from Lake Bracciano. Within its borders lies the small Monterosi lake, legacy of a now-extinct volcanic activity in the region.

Monterosi borders the following municipalities: Nepi, Sutri, Trevignano Romano.

References

Cities and towns in Lazio